Charles Bishop is the name of:
Charles Reed Bishop (1822–1915), Hawaiian businessman
Charles Francis Bishop (1888–1954), US Navy/Medal of Honor recipient
Charles Bishop (cricketer) (1879–1943), English cricketer
Charles A. Bishop (1854–1908), politician and jurist in the State of Iowa
Charles E. Bishop (1921–2012), authority in the field of agricultural economics and president of the University of Arkansas
Charles F. Bishop (1844–1913), Mayor of the City of Buffalo, New York
Charles Lawrence Bishop (1876–1966), Canadian journalist and politician
Charles Bishop (Alabama politician), Alabama senator fl. 1983–present
Charles Bishop (c. 1987–2002), suicide pilot of the 2002 Tampa Cessna 172 crash
Charlie Bishop (baseball) (1924–1993), Major League Baseball player
Charlie Bishop (footballer) (born 1968), English former footballer
Charles Bishop (Home and Away), a fictional character on the Australian soap opera Home and Away

See also
Charles Bishop Weyland